Tyson Wood (born September 17, 1995) is a Canadian actor. He has had several roles including his role as Tim Cherry in the biographical television drama Keep Your Head Up Kid: The Don Cherry Story and in the role of Billy Campbell in the horror film The Haunting in Connecticut.

Career
Wood is from Winnipeg, Manitoba, and currently resides in Vancouver.

Wood made his film debut in 2002, having a role in the movie Hell on Heels: The Battle of Mary Kay playing the younger version of R.H. Thomson's character, Richard Rogers. Soon after, he had a role in the television movie On Thin Ice as Nate Kilmer. In 2005, Wood would be seen in the feature film, The Big White alongside Robin Williams, the same year he was seen in the television series, The Collector in the episode "The Mother" as well as a television movie, Vinegar Hill. In 2007, he had a role in the television movie, Maneater as Roy Satterly. Wood can be seen in the 2008 film The Lazarus Project. He currently attends school in Canada.

In 2009, Wood had a role in the film The Haunting in Connecticut as Billy Campbell, winning Young Artist Awards for Best Performance in a Feature Film Supporting Young Actor for his performance.

Filmography

Television

References

External links

1995 births
Living people
Canadian male film actors
Canadian male television actors
Canadian male voice actors
Canadian male child actors
Male actors from Winnipeg
Canadian people of Ukrainian descent
Canadian people of Arab descent
Canadian people of Lebanese descent
Canadian people of Palestinian descent